Frauke Eigen (born 1969 in Aurich, West Germany) is a German photographer, photojournalist and artist.

Early life

Eigen studied at the Royal College of Art in London.

Kosovo war photographs
In 2000, while Eigen was working as a photo-journalist for a government relief organisation in Kosovo, she heard that mass graves were being exhumed, and went to see them. She saw the bodies of the people who had been killed in 'ethnic cleansing', and later on, their clothing and other belongings, which had been removed and washed. Eigen found the belongings more emotionally moving than the bodies, and decided to photograph them instead. These photographs became the basis for Fundstücke Kosovo (Kosovo Finds).

In 2011–12, Fundstücke Kosovo featured in  Imperial War Museum London's Women War Artists exhibition. Kathleen Palmer, Head of Art at the Imperial War Museum, commented that: "this focus upon their personal possessions brings to life the people who had been killed. Since the images themselves are not horrific and graphic, they allow the viewer to relate to the horror in a different way.... They allow us to engage with the horror more immediately."

Fundstücke Kosovo was later published as an edition of ten sets of fourteen photographs. One set was acquired by the Imperial War Museum, and another by the National Gallery of Canada.

Eigen's photographs were later used as evidence by the War Crimes Tribunal in The Hague.

Other war photography

Eigen recently completed a photographic project in Afghanistan.

See also
 War crimes in the Kosovo War

References

Living people
German photojournalists
German war artists
War photographers
War crimes in the Kosovo War
1969 births
German women photographers
20th-century German photographers
21st-century German photographers
Photographers from Lower Saxony
People from Aurich
20th-century women photographers
21st-century women photographers
20th-century German women
21st-century German women
Women photojournalists